Samuel Joseph Glanzman (December 5, 1924 – July 12, 2017) was an American comics artist and memoirist. Glanzman is best known for his Charlton Comics series Hercules, about the mythological Greek demigod; his autobiographical war stories about his service aboard the U.S.S. Stevens for DC Comics and Marvel Comics; and the Charlton Comics Fightin' Army feature "The Lonely War of Willy Schultz", a Vietnam War-era serial about a German-American U.S. Army captain during World War II.

Biography

Early life and career
Glanzman was born on December 5, 1924, in Baltimore, Maryland, the son of Florence and Gustave Glanzman. His father was Jewish and his mother Catholic. His brothers were comic-book artists D.C. (Davis Charles) Glanzman, and Louis "Lew" Glanzman, the latter of whom went on to become a fine art painter.

Glanzman ended his formal education after grade school. He entered the comics industry in late 1939, during the period historians and fans call the Golden Age of comic books, at Funnies, Inc., one of the early "packagers" that supplied comics to publishers then entering the fledgling medium. There, for Centaur Publications, he wrote two-page text stories with incidental art for Amazing-Man Comics. Later, for Harvey Comics, he created Fly-Man in the superhero anthology Spitfire Comics #1 (August 1941), writing and drawing the feature for at least two issues. He also contributed to Harvey's All-New Short Story Comics (where he published his first recorded war story); Champ Comics (stories about the superhero Human Meteor); and the radio program tie-in series Green Hornet Comics through 1943.

He served in the U.S. Navy, during World War II, stationed on the destroyer U.S.S. Stevens, and was discharged in 1946. Eschewing work in comics ("I was getting $7.50 a page for [Fly-Man], pencils, inks, story, and coloring ... I figured, 'Hell, that's not much money.'"), he began a peripatetic career doing manual labor in cabinet shops, lumber mills, and boat yards. After marrying in the 1950s, he worked at Republic Aviation in Farmingdale, New York, installing machine guns on military jets.  During this time, he lived in Rockaway, Queens, and in the Long Island towns of Valley Stream and Massapequa Park.

Seeking to return to art, Glanzman did some work for the Eastern Color series Heroic Comics and New Heroic Comics in 1950, and found better-paying assignments doing children's book illustration. He may have done uncredited work for his brother Lew on a hardcover book series for children about aircraft. Work was not steady, however, and Glanzman returned to Republic Aviation.

Charlton Comics

In 1958, Glanzman began working with Pat Masulli, the executive editor of Charlton Comics, a low-paying publishing company. He specialized in stories for the war titles Attack, Battlefield Action, Fightin' Air Force, Fightin' Marines, Submarine Attack, U.S. Air Force Comics, and War at Sea, producing a large amount of authentically detailed work. In mid-1961 he switched to Dell Comics. where he worked on the anthology Combat, drew the movie adaptation Voyage to the Bottom of the Sea (and the similar, though unrelated, four-issue Voyage to the Deep), and a range of titles from lost-world adventure (Kona, Monarch of Monster Isle) to heartwarming animal drama (Lad: A Dog). He occasionally still moonlighted for Charlton, using the initials "SJG" for his work on the 1962 Marco Polo movie adaptation and elsewhere.

Beginning mid-1964, Glanzman moved regularly between Charlton and Dell assignments, almost exclusively on war stories, but also on a Charlton Tarzan series. Although some sources credit him for co-creating the Charlton hardboiled detective character Sarge Steel, he stated in a 2009 interview that "The only thing I created was the "U.S.S. Stevens", "Attu" and A Sailor's Story."

During the 1960s Glanzman and writer Gill created the Charlton mythological-adventure series Hercules: Adventures of the Man-God, which would run 13 issues (Oct. 1967 - Sept. 1969), and showcased Glanzman's experimental side, where he might float Art Nouveau-bordered panels within action tableaux filled with Hieronymous Boschian nightmares.

Also during this time he co-created, with writer Will Franz, "The Lonely War of Willy Schultz", a departure from most other World War II features of this time, with a conflicted American soldier of German heritage caught between loyalties. During combat in the European Theater, U.S. Army captain Schultz is falsely accused and convicted of murder; he escapes and blends into the German Army while seeking a way to clear his name and retain his Allied allegiance. The feature, reprinted as late as 1999, was serialized in Charlton's Fightin' Army #76–80, 82–92 (Oct. 1967 – July 1968 and Nov. 1968 – July 1970).

Glanzman freelanced for Outdoor Life magazine in the 1960s as well.

DC Comics
War comics editor-artist Joe Kubert of industry giant DC Comics brought Glanzman to work on Our Army at War, Star Spangled War Stories, Weird War Tales, and other combat titles including G.I. Combat, where for years he illustrated the feature "Haunted Tank". At DC, Glanzman began his series of autobiographical war stories about his service aboard the U.S.S. Stevens in Our Army at War #218 (April 1970). Glanzman would also occasionally draw stories for DC's supernatural-mystery anthologies. He was one of the contributors to the debut issues of Ghosts and Blitzkrieg. By late 1979, with most of DC's war titles either canceled or converted to character series with established teams, Glanzman remained solely on G.I. Combat and began freelancing again for Charlton. Following his last "Haunted Tank" story, in G.I. Combat #288 (March 1987), Glanzman drew two more stories for DC a year later, in Sgt. Rock #420–421 (Feb.–April 1988). He would return to ink penciler Tim Truman on the Western miniseries Jonah Hex: Two Gun Mojo (Sept.–Dec. 1993), Jonah Hex: Riders of the Worm and Such (March–July 1995), and Jonah Hex: Shadows West (Feb.–April 1999) all written by Joe R. Lansdale.

Later career

Glanzman also contributed a handful of war stories to Marvel Comics from 1986–1989, in the black-and-white adventure magazine Savage Tales, the Marine Corps series Semper Fi, an issue of The 'Nam, and most notably A Sailor's Story / Marvel Graphic Novel #30 (March 1987), a 60-page true account, which he both wrote and drew, of his time on the U.S.S. Stevens during World War II. Unusually for Marvel's graphic novel line, it was released in hardcover rather than as a trade paperback. A trade paperback edition followed, together with a sequel, A Sailor's Story, Book Two: Winds, Dreams, and Dragons, which continued the story up to the end of the war.

Other work in the 1990s included inking some issues of Turok Dinosaur Hunter for Acclaim Comics and Zorro for Topps Comics, and writing and drawing a serialized feature in Flashback Comics' Fantastic Worlds #1. His later work includes stories in two anthologies: writing and drawing the 10-page, true-life story "On the Job: Cooks Tour," in the graphic-story trade paperback Streetwise (TwoMorrows Publishing, 2000), and the donated, four-page "There Were Tears in Her Eyes," in the squarebound benefit comic 9-11: The World's Finest Comic Book Writers & Artists Tell Stories to Remember, Volume Two (2002).

From 1999–2001, the Avalon Communications imprint America's Comic Group / ACG (not to be confused with American Comics Group / AGC) reprinted large amounts of Glanzman's Charlton Comics work in a number of mostly one-shot titles, including Hercules, Flyboys, Nam Tales, Star Combat Tales, Total War, and ACG Comics Presents Fire and Steel.

In 2003, Glanzman began working on webcomics, writing and drawing the 19th-century nautical adventure Apple Jack, and reteaming with his "Willy Schultz" writer, Will Franz, on the Roman centurion series The Eagle. In 2012 and 2013, new "U.S.S. Stevens" stories by Glanzman appeared in the Joe Kubert Presents six-issue anthology limited series. In 2015, Glanzman's "U.S.S. Stevens" stories and the A Sailor's Story graphic novels were collected by Dover Publications.

Glanzman died on July 12, 2017, in Maryland, New York, under hospice care after falling and undergoing surgery.

Bibliography
Glanzman's U.S.S. Stevens stories for DC Comics appear in:
 Our Army at War #220, 223, 225, 227, 230–232, 235 238, 240–242, 244–245, 247–248, 256–259, 261–262, 265–267, 275, 281–282,  284, 293, 298 (1970–1976)
Our Fighting Forces 128, 132, 134, 136, 138–139, 140–141, 143 (1970–1972)
Weird War Tales #4 (1972)
G.I. Combat #152 (1972)
Star Spangled War Stories #167, 171, 174 (1973)
Sgt. Rock #304, 308 (1977)
Sgt. Rock Special #1 (1992)
Joe Kubert Presents #1–6 (2012–2013)

References

External links
Sam Glanzman Bio. WebCitation archive.
 
Sam Glanzman at Mike's Amazing World of Comics
Sam Glanzman at the Unofficial Handbook of Marvel Comics Creators

1924 births
2017 deaths
20th-century American artists
21st-century American artists
American children's book illustrators
American comics artists
American comics writers
American graphic novelists
American magazine illustrators
United States Navy personnel of World War II
Inkpot Award winners
Jewish American artists
Jewish American writers
Jewish American military personnel
American memoirists
Artists from New York (state)
Charlton Comics
DC Comics people
Golden Age comics creators
Marvel Comics people
People from Massapequa Park, New York
People from Rockaway, Queens
People from Valley Stream, New York
Silver Age comics creators